Koothan is a 2018 Indian Tamil-language musical film written and directed by Venky AL. The film stars newcomers Raj Kumar and Srijita Ghosh while Nagendra Prasad plays the main antagonist. Koothan released to negative reviews whereas its dance sequences were praised.

Plot 
Raana (Raj Kumar) is a dancer who earns his living by doing several shows. His mother (Urvashi), a junior artiste in films, is a nightmare for filmmakers, thanks to her terrible acting skills. He once happens to meet Srilakshmi (Srijita Ghosh), another dancer, at a competition held in the city, where the latter makes her presence only to settle some personal scores with Krishna (Nagendra Prasad). Raana and Srilakshmi become close eventually after meeting a couple of times.

Cast
Raj Kumar as Raana, head of the Battery Boys dance team
 Nagendra Prasad as Krishna, the main antagonist
Srijita Ghosh as Srilakshmi
 Kira Narayanan as Devi, Srilakshmi's sister
 K. Bhagyaraj
 Urvashi as Kalairasi, Raana's mother
 Sonal Singh as Dimple, a member of the Battery Boys dance team
 Ashmini Balakrishnan as Apoorva, Srilakshmi's friend
 Sriranjini
 Renuka
 Manobala as Film Director
 Ramki as himself
 Junior Balaiah

Reception 
A critic from The Times of India gave the film one-and-a-half out of five stars and wrote that "The film, except for a few dance movements and the performances of Rajkumar and Nagendra Prasad, is a tiresome watch".

References 

2018 films
2010s Tamil-language films